William Hare "Gobo" Ashley (10 February 1862 – 14 July 1930) was a South African cricketer who played in one Test in 1889, the second Test ever played by his country. 

A left-arm medium-paced bowler, Ashley took 7 for 95 in the only Test innings he bowled in, becoming the second South African to take a five-wicket haul after Albert Rose-Innes during that inaugural South African Test earlier in the year. Ashley later played three first-class matches for a Cape Town Clubs team and Western Province in South African domestic cricket in 1890 and 1891, taking 13 wickets. He was a member of Western Province team that won the 1890–91 Champion Bat Tournament, when he opened the bowling with Voltelin van der Bijl.

See also
 List of South Africa cricketers who have taken five-wicket hauls on Test debut
 One Test Wonder

References

External links

 

1862 births
1930 deaths
South Africa Test cricketers
South African cricketers
Western Province cricketers
Cricketers from Cape Town
Cricketers who have taken five wickets on Test debut